The 1989–90 NBA season was the 22nd season for the Seattle SuperSonics in the National Basketball Association. It was Bernie Bickerstaff's last season as head coach of the Sonics, and the first season for rookie and future All-Star forward Shawn Kemp, who was selected with the 17th pick in the 1989 NBA draft. After winning two of their first three games, the Sonics lost in a quintuple-overtime game on November 9 to the Milwaukee Bucks, 155–154 at the Bradley Center. The Sonics played around .500 for the entire season, holding a 22–23 record at the All-Star break, and peaking late in the season at 34–32 before going 7–9 to end their season, as they finished fourth in the Pacific Division with a 41–41 record, losing the #8 seed in the Western Conference to the Houston Rockets, who had the same record but were ahead after tie-breaks, and thus did not reach the playoffs.

Dale Ellis led the team in scoring averaging 23.5 points per game, but only played 55 games due to a collapsed lung and broken ribs suffered from a car accident in January, while Xavier McDaniel averaged 21.3 points and 6.5 rebounds per game, and Derrick McKey provided the team with 15.7 points and 6.1 rebounds per game. In addition, Sedale Threatt contributed 11.4 points per game, while Michael Cage averaged 9.7 points and 10.0 rebounds per game, top draft pick Dana Barros contributed 9.7 points per game, and Nate McMillan provided with 6.4 points, 7.3 assists and 1.7 steals per game. 

This was also McDaniel's final full season in Seattle, as he was traded midway through the following season to the Phoenix Suns.

Draft picks

Seattle drafted future All-Stars Dana Barros and Shawn Kemp as their only two picks of the 1989 Draft. Kemp would go on to have a successful 8-year run with the Sonics.

Roster

|-

Regular season

Season standings

Record vs. opponents

Game log

|- bgcolor="#bbffbb"
|| 1 || November 3, 1989 || Minnesota Timberwolves || 106–94 || Ellis (33) || Cage (11) || Threatt (6) || 13,805(Seattle, Washington) || 1-0
|- bgcolor="#edbebf"
|| 2 || November 4, 1989 || at Sacramento Kings || 100–107 || Cage (24) || Cage (13) || McMillan and Barros (4) || 17,104(Sacramento, California) || 1-1
|- bgcolor="#bbffbb"
|| 3 || November 7, 1989 || Charlotte Hornets || 128–88 || McDaniel and Ellis (23) || Cage (14) || McMillan (9) || 9,521(Seattle, Washington) || 2-1
|- bgcolor="#edbebf"
|| 4 || November 9, 1989 || at Milwaukee Bucks || 154–155 (5OT) || Ellis (55) || McDaniel (13) || McMillan (10) || 14,012(Milwaukee, Wisconsin) || 2-2
|- bgcolor="#edbebf"
|| 5 || November 11, 1989 || at Chicago Bulls || 102–109 || Ellis (30) || Cage (10) || McMillan (10) || 16,676(Chicago, Illinois) || 2-3
|- bgcolor="#bbffbb"
|| 6 || November 12, 1989 || at Minnesota Timberwolves || 108–97 || McKey (32) || Cage (16) || McMillan (12) || 21,702(Minneapolis, Minnesota) || 3-3
|- bgcolor="#edbebf"
|| 7 || November 14, 1989 || Dallas Mavericks || 109–113 (OT) || McDaniel (31) || Cage (10) || McDaniel and McMillan (5) || 9,880(Seattle, Washington) || 3-4
|- bgcolor="#bbffbb"
|| 8 || November 16, 1989 || Washington Bullets || 111–98 || McDaniel (26) || McKey (11) || Barros (6) || 9,562(Seattle, Washington) || 4-4
|- bgcolor="#bbffbb"
|| 9 || November 18, 1989 || Chicago Bulls || 119–110 || McDaniel (36) || Cage (10) || McMillan (10) || 14,708(Seattle, Washington) || 5-4
|- bgcolor="#edbebf"
|| 10 || November 19, 1989 || at Portland Trail Blazers || 109–119 || Ellis and Cage (17) || Cage (15) || Ellis (6) || 12,884(Portland, Oregon) || 5-5
|- bgcolor="#bbffbb"
|| 11 || November 21, 1989 || New Jersey Nets || 114–84 || McDaniel (26) || Cage (15) || McMillan (11) || 12,109(Seattle, Washington) || 6-5
|- bgcolor="#edbebf"
|| 12 || November 24, 1989 || at Denver Nuggets || 109–122 || Barros (18) || Cage and Kemp (8) || Johnson (10) || 13,061(Denver, Colorado) || 6-6
|- bgcolor="#bbffbb"
|| 13 || November 25, 1989 || at Dallas Mavericks || 117–70 || McDaniel (22) || Cage (14) || McMillan (8) || 17,007(Dallas, Texas) || 7-6
|- bgcolor="#edbebf"
|| 14 || November 28, 1989 || at San Antonio Spurs || 104–117 || Ellis (37) || McMillan (11) || McMillan (14) || 12,115(San Antonio, Texas) || 7-7
|- bgcolor="#bbffbb"
|| 15 || November 30, 1989 || New York Knicks || 127–122 || McDaniel (37) || McKey and McMillan (8) || McMillan (13) || 13,583(Seattle, Washington) || 8-7

|- bgcolor="#bbffbb"
|| 16 || December 2, 1989 || Detroit Pistons || 120–95 || Ellis (30) || McDaniel (10) || McMillan (14) || 14,546(Seattle, Washington) || 9-7
|- bgcolor="#bbffbb"
|| 17 || December 5, 1989 || Houston Rockets || 133–123 || McDaniel (36) || McDaniel (10) || McMillan (11) || 9,241(Seattle, Washington) || 10-7
|- bgcolor="#bbffbb"
|| 18 || December 9, 1989 || Los Angeles Clippers || 104–100 || Ellis (28) || Cage (15) || McMillan (6) || 12,548(Seattle, Washington) || 11-7
|- bgcolor="#edbebf"
|| 19 || December 13, 1989 || at Boston Celtics || 97–109 || Ellis (32) || Ellis and Cage (9) || McMillan (7) || 14,890(Boston, Massachusetts) || 11-8
|- bgcolor="#edbebf"
|| 20 || December 15, 1989 || at Cleveland Cavaliers || 101–120 || McKey (20) || Cage (13) || Johnson (5) || 15,072(Richfield, Ohio) || 11-9
|- bgcolor="#edbebf"
|| 21 || December 16, 1989 || at New York Knicks || 97–118 || Cage (19) || Cage (10) || Johnson (5) || 18,212(New York City, New York) || 11-10
|- bgcolor="#edbebf"
|| 22 || December 19, 1989 || at Detroit Pistons || 77–94 || Threatt (18) || Cage (9) || McMillan (7) || 21,454(Auburn Hills, Michigan) || 11-11
|- bgcolor="#bbffbb"
|| 23 || December 21, 1989 || Portland Trail Blazers || 123–102 || Ellis (23) || Cage (13) || McMillan (14) || 13,190(Seattle, Washington) || 12-11
|- bgcolor="#edbebf"
|| 24 || December 23, 1989 || Indiana Pacers || 95–98 || McDaniel (29) || Cage (12) || McMillan (11) || 14,377(Seattle, Washington) || 12-12
|- bgcolor="#bbffbb"
|| 25 || December 27, 1989 || Philadelphia 76ers || 110–106 || Ellis (33) || Cage (13) || Threatt (7) || 14,381(Seattle, Washington) || 13-12
|- bgcolor="#edbebf"
|| 26 || December 29, 1989 || Boston Celtics || 89–96 || McDaniel (26) || Cage (14) || McMillan (7) || 14,708(Seattle, Washington) || 13-13

|- bgcolor="#edbebf"
|| 27 || January 3, 1990 || Utah Jazz || 108–119 || McDaniel (25) || Cage (19) || Johnson (8) || 12,314(Seattle, Washington) || 13-14
|- bgcolor="#bbffbb"
|| 28 || January 5, 1990 || Miami Heat || 140–110 || Ellis (26) || Kemp (9) || Johnson (17) || 9,819(Seattle, Washington) || 14-14
|- bgcolor="#bbffbb"
|| 29 || January 6, 1990 || Phoenix Suns || 120–110 || McDaniel (29) || Cage (10) || Johnson (11) || 14,430(Seattle, Washington) || 15-14
|- bgcolor="#edbebf"
|| 30 || January 8, 1990 || at Dallas Mavericks || 96–110 || McDaniel (19) || McDaniel and Polynice (8) || Johnson (9) || 16,561(Dallas, Texas) || 15-15
|- bgcolor="#edbebf"
|| 31 || January 9, 1990 || at Houston Rockets || 90–97 || Ellis (22) || McMillan (9) || McMillan (8) || 15,251(Houston, Texas) || 15-16
|- bgcolor="#bbffbb"
|| 32 || January 11, 1990 || Dallas Mavericks || 98–87 || Ellis (29) || Cage and McMillan (8) || McMillan (10) || 9,397(Seattle, Washington) || 16-16
|- bgcolor="#bbffbb"
|| 33 || January 13, 1990 || Atlanta Hawks || 113–106 || McDaniel (33) || McDaniel (14) || Johnson (11) || 14,330(Seattle, Washington) || 17-16
|- bgcolor="#bbffbb"
|| 34 || January 15, 1990 || Houston Rockets || 105–101 || McDaniel (25) || Cage (11) || Johnson (7) || 11,404(Seattle, Washington) || 18-16
|- bgcolor="#edbebf"
|| 35 || January 17, 1990 || at Los Angeles Lakers || 90–100 || Threatt (26) || McDaniel (7) || McMillan (9) || 17,505(Inglewood, California) || 18-17
|- bgcolor="#edbebf"
|| 36 || January 18, 1990 || at Los Angeles Clippers || 95–105 || McDaniel (30) || McDaniel and McKey (8) || Threatt (6) || 11.150(Los Angeles, California) || 18-18
|- bgcolor="#edbebf"
|| 37 || January 20, 1990 || at Phoenix Suns || 98–117 || Threatt (21) || Cage (8) || McMillan (6) || 14,487(Phoenix, Arizona) || 18-19
|- bgcolor="#edbebf"
|| 38 || January 24, 1990 || Milwaukee Bucks || 112–119 || McDaniel (32) || McMillan (9) || McDaniel (8) || 10,903(Seattle, Washington) || 18-20
|- bgcolor="#edbebf"
|| 39 || January 26, 1990 || at Golden State Warriors || 102–114 || Threatt (36) || McDaniel (15) || McDaniel (7) || 15,025(Oakland, California) || 18-21
|- bgcolor="#bbffbb"
|| 40 || January 27, 1990 || San Antonio Spurs || 109–98 || McDaniel (34) || Cage (9) || McMillan (8) || 14,519(Seattle, Washington) || 19-21
|- bgcolor="#edbebf"
|| 41 || January 31, 1990 || at Minnesota Timberwolves || 82–110 || McKey (16) || McKey (9) || McMillan (8) || 24,153(Minneapolis, Minnesota) || 19-22

|- bgcolor="#bbffbb"
|| 42 || February 2, 1990 || at Indiana Pacers || 87–86 || McDaniel (25) || Cage (12) || McMillan and Barros (4) || 12,858(Indianapolis, Indiana) || 20-22
|- bgcolor="#bbffbb"
|| 43 || February 3, 1990 || at Washington Bullets || 94–92 || McDaniel (29) || McDaniel and Cage (8) || McMillan (8) || 12,066(Landover, Maryland) || 21-22
|- bgcolor="#bbffbb"
|| 44 || February 5, 1990 || at Charlotte Hornets || 101–100 || McDaniel (22) || Cage (10) || McMillan, McDaniel, Sellers (4) || 23,901(Charlotte, North Carolina) || 22-22
|- bgcolor="#edbebf"
|| 45 || February 7, 1990 || Phoenix Suns || 124–128 || McKey (26) || Polynice (8) || McMillan (8) || 11,420(Seattle, Washington) || 22-23
|- bgcolor="#edbebf"
|| 46 || February 13, 1990 || Portland Trail Blazers || 106–110 || McDaniel (35) || McKey and Cage (10) || McMillan (15) || 12,717(Seattle, Washington) || 22-24
|- bgcolor="#bbffbb"
|| 47 || February 15, 1990 || at New Jersey Nets || 103–92 || McKey (31) || McKey (14) || McMillan (9) || 9,304(East Rutherford, New Jersey) || 23-24
|- bgcolor="#edbebf"
|| 48 || February 16, 1990 || at Philadelphia 76ers || 96–100 (OT) || McDaniel (25) || McKey (13) || McMillan (12) || 16,190(Philadelphia, Pennsylvania) || 23-25
|- bgcolor="#bbffbb"
|| 49 || February 18, 1990 || at Charlotte Hornets || 85–70 || McDaniel (20) || Cage (11) || McMillan (4) || 23,901(Charlotte, North Carolina) || 24-25
|- bgcolor="#bbffbb"
|| 50 || February 20, 1990 || at Orlando Magic || 117–102 || McDaniel (27) || McDaniel and Cage (10) || McMillan (17) || 15,077(Orlando, Florida) || 25-25
|- bgcolor="#bbffbb"
|| 51 || February 21, 1990 || at Miami Heat || 92–85 || Barros (18) || Cage (12) || McMillan (7) || 15,008(Miami, Florida) || 26-25
|- bgcolor="#bbffbb"
|| 52 || February 23, 1990 || Sacramento Kings || 97–85 || McKey (24) || Cage (20) || McMillan (9) || 13,023(Seattle, Washington) || 27-25
|- bgcolor="#bbffbb"
|| 53 || February 25, 1990 || Golden State Warriors || 110–102 || McKey (33) || Cage (13) || McMillan (8) || 11,775(Seattle, Washington) || 28-25
|- bgcolor="#edbebf"
|| 54 || February 27, 1990 || at Los Angeles Clippers || 99–103 || Barros (28) || McKey (10) || McKey and McMillan (5) || 10,826(Los Angeles, California) || 28-26
|- bgcolor="#edbebf"
|| 55 || February 28, 1990 || Los Angeles Lakers || 107–112 || Barros (20) || McKey (11) || McMillan (7) || 14,542(Seattle, Washington) || 28-27

|- bgcolor="#bbffbb"
|| 56 || March 2, 1990 || Minnesota Timberwolves || 99–83 || McKey (18) || McKey (9) || McMillan (10) || 11,272(Seattle, Washington) || 29-27
|- bgcolor="#edbebf"
|| 57 || March 3, 1990 || at Portland Trail Blazers || 98–110 || McKey (22) || McMillan and Cage (10) || McMillan (7) || 12,884(Portland, Oregon) || 29-28
|- bgcolor="#bbffbb"
|| 58 || March 6, 1990 || Cleveland Cavaliers || 95–90 || Barros (23) || Cage (13) || McKey, McMillan, Barros (4) || 12,019(Seattle, Washington) || 30-28
|- bgcolor="#edbebf"
|| 59 || March 8, 1990 || at Houston Rockets || 97–111 || Cage (20) || Cage (14) || Barros (6) || 16,611(Houston, Texas) || 30-29
|- bgcolor="#edbebf"
|| 60 || March 9, 1990 || at Atlanta Hawks || 97–107 || Barros (26) || Cage (10) || Barros (10) || 14,625(Atlanta, Georgia) || 30-30
|- bgcolor="#bbffbb"
|| 61 || March 12, 1990 || Orlando Magic || 130–105 || Ellis (24) || McMillan and Kemp (9) || McMillan (11) || 10,178(Seattle, Washington) || 31-30
|- bgcolor="#bbffbb"
|| 62 || March 14, 1990 || Charlotte Hornets || 103–100 || Farmer (26) || Cage (14) || McMillan (13) || 8,115(Seattle, Washington) || 32-30
|- bgcolor="#edbebf"
|| 63 || March 15, 1990 || at Utah Jazz || 95–117 || Polynice (18) || Kemp (8) || McKey (4) || 12,616(Salt Lake City, Utah) || 32-31
|- bgcolor="#bbffbb"
|| 64 || March 18, 1990 || at Golden State Warriors || 121–116 || Ellis (30) || McKey (11) || McMillan (7) || 15,025(Oakland, California) || 33-31
|- bgcolor="#edbebf"
|| 65 || March 20, 1990 || San Antonio Spurs || 106–128 || Kemp (20) || Cage (9) || McMillan and Barros (6) || 14,541(Seattle, Washington) || 33-32
|- bgcolor="#bbffbb"
|| 66 || March 22, 1990 || Denver Nuggets || 125–118 || McDaniel (24) || Cage (15) || McMillan (16) || 9,830(Seattle, Washington) || 34-32
|- bgcolor="#edbebf"
|| 67 || March 24, 1990 || at Phoenix Suns || 95–121 || Kemp (16) || McKey (9) || McMillan (4) || 14,487(Phoenix, Arizona) || 34-33
|- bgcolor="#edbebf"
|| 68 || March 25, 1990 || at Los Angeles Lakers || 94–116 || Kemp (19) || Cage (9) || McMillan (6) || 17,505(Inglewood, California) || 34-34
|- bgcolor="#edbebf"
|| 69 || March 27, 1990 || at San Antonio Spurs || 103–115 || Ellis (36) || Cage (7) || McMillan (14) || 14,345(San Antonio, Texas) || 34-35
|- bgcolor="#bbffbb"
|| 70 || March 30, 1990 || Golden State Warriors || 139–108 || McDaniel (34) || Cage (12) || Threatt (13) || 13,542(Seattle, Washington) || 35-35

|- bgcolor="#edbebf"
|| 71 || April 1, 1990 || at Los Angeles Clippers || 103–104 || Ellis (39) || Cage (21) || McMillan (8) || 11,815(Los Angeles, California) || 35-36
|- bgcolor="#bbffbb"
|| 72 || April 3, 1990 || Portland Trail Blazers || 136–134 (OT) || Ellis (30) || Kemp (8) || McMillan (4) || 11,414(Seattle, Washington) || 36-36
|- bgcolor="#bbffbb"
|| 73 || April 5, 1990 || Utah Jazz || 101–91 || Threatt (19) || McDaniel (12) || Barros (5) || 12,573(Seattle, Washington) || 37-36
|- bgcolor="#edbebf"
|| 74 || April 6, 1990 || at Denver Nuggets || 103–119 || Threatt (22) || Cage (11) || McMillan (8) || 16,212(Denver, Colorado) || 37-37
|- bgcolor="#edbebf"
|| 75 || April 9, 1990 || Sacramento Kings || 105–106 || Ellis (33) || Cage (12) || McMillan (12) || 11,678(Seattle, Washington) || 37-38
|- bgcolor="#edbebf"
|| 76 || April 10, 1990 || at Utah Jazz || 102–114 || Ellis (30) || McKey (6) || Ellis (6) || 12,616(Salt Lake City, Utah) || 37-39
|- bgcolor="#bbffbb"
|| 77 || April 12, 1990 || Denver Nuggets || 113–103 || McDaniel (26) || Cage (14) || McKey (7) || 10,617(Seattle, Washington) || 38-39
|- bgcolor="#bbffbb"
|| 78 || April 14, 1990 || Phoenix Suns || 96–89 || Ellis (30) || Cage (13) || Threatt (11) || 12,903(Seattle, Washington) || 39-39
|- bgcolor="#edbebf"
|| 79 || April 17, 1990 || Los Angeles Lakers || 101–102 || Ellis (28) || Cage (12) || McMillan (10) || 14,489(Seattle, Washington) || 39-40
|- bgcolor="#bbffbb"
|| 80 || April 19, 1990 || at Sacramento Kings || 130–118 (OT) || Ellis (43) || Cage (11) || Threatt (12) || 17,014(Sacramento, California) || 40-40
|- bgcolor="#bbffbb"
|| 81 || April 20, 1990 || Los Angeles Clippers || 121–99 || Ellis (36) || Cage (12) || McMillan (10) || 12,090(Seattle, Washington) || 41-40
|- bgcolor="#edbebf"
|| 82 || April 22, 1990 || at Golden State Warriors || 122-124 || Ellis (33) || McDaniel (14) || McDaniel and Threatt (6) || 15,025(Oakland, California) || 41-41
|-

Player statistics

Legend

Season

1. Statistics with the SuperSonics.

Awards, records, and honors
The Sonics did not have any awards, records, and honors.

Transactions

Overview

Trades

Free agents

Additions

Subtractions

Player Transactions Citation:

See also
 1989–90 NBA season

References

Seattle SuperSonics seasons